Craig Marriner (born 1974) is a novelist from Rotorua, New Zealand. He is best known for his award-winning first novel Stonedogs (2001).

Early life
Marriner was born in Rotorua and had what he describes as a "strictly working-class background"; his father was a forestry worker until he was made redundant. Marriner left high school before completing his final year, describing himself as being "on the edge of the rails by then". He moved to the remote town of Mount Magnet, Western Australia with the intention of getting a mining job, and worked doing geological sampling. He subsequently spend four years working in Europe.

Career
Marriner's debut novel Stonedogs (2001) won the Deutz Medal for Fiction, the Fiction Prize and the NZSA Hubert Church Best First Book Award for Fiction at the 2002 Montana New Zealand Book Awards. In 2003 the film rights were sold to Australian production company Mushroom Pictures, although as of 2021 no film has been made. In 2004 he was the recipient of the Buddle Findlay Sargeson Fellowship. His second novel Southern Style was published in 2006. At the time he was said to have been working on a third novel about a group of backpackers trekking through Europe during the 2003 invasion of Iraq.

Style
In 2001 Marriner described himself as wanting to be seen as "a Kiwi art house youth culture-type writer". He cited his influences as George Orwell, Kurt Vonnegut and Hunter S Thompson, as well as journalist Robert Fisk and Marxist theorist Leon Trotsky. His writing style has been compared to Scottish novelist Irvine Welsh.

References

External links 
 Marriner's profile at Read NZ Te Pou Muramura
 Review of Stonedogs by Duncan McLean for The Spinoff, 30 November 2017

1974 births
Living people
New Zealand male novelists
People from Rotorua
21st-century New Zealand novelists
21st-century New Zealand male writers